Joseph Davis Blalock (February 4, 1919 – August 21, 1974) was an American football player.  He played college football for the Clemson Tigers football team from 1939 to 1941 and was selected by both the Sporting News and the Central Press Association as a first-team end on the 1941 College Football All-America Team.  He was also selected by the United Press as a second-team All-American in 1940.  Clemson claims him as the school's first two-time All-American. He was an inaugural inductee into the Clemson Hall of Fame in 1973. He died of a respiratory ailment in 1974 at age 55.

References 

1919 births
1974 deaths
American football ends
Clemson Tigers football players
Players of American football from North Carolina
People from Charlotte, North Carolina